These are the official results of the Women's 100 metres event at the 1987 IAAF World Championships in Rome, Italy. There were a total number of 51 participating athletes, with seven qualifying heats and the final held on Sunday 1987-08-30.

Results

Final
Sunday, 30 August 1987
Wind:  -0.5

Semifinals
Sunday, 30 August 1987
Wind:  
Heat 1: +2.2
Heat 2: +0.7

Quarterfinals
Saturday, 29 August 1987
Wind:  
Heat 1: -0.3
Heat 2: +1.6
Heat 3: -1.6
Heat 4: -1.1

Heats
Saturday, 29 August 1987
Wind:  
Heat 1: +2.3
Heat 2: +1.3
Heat 3: +1.0
Heat 4: -0.6
Heat 5: +0.2
Heat 6: +0.7
Heat 7: -0.6

References
 Results

 
100 metres at the World Athletics Championships
1987 in women's athletics